Jerome F. Fox (March 26, 1904September 13, 1957) was an American lawyer and politician.

Biography
Born in Chilton, Wisconsin, Fox attended Chilton High School. He received a bachelor's degree from the University of Notre Dame in 1924. He taught and coached at Trinity College, Sioux City, Iowa from 1924 to 1926 and then attended Marquette University Law School. He received a law degree from the University of Wisconsin in 1930, after which he practiced law in Chilton. Fox served in the Wisconsin State Assembly from 1931 to 1935, where he was the Democratic floor leader. He was the legal officer for the Home Owners Loan Corporation until 1938, when he ran for the Democratic nomination for Governor of Wisconsin. Fox served in the United States Navy during World War II. From 1946 to 1952, he was mayor of Chilton. He also served on the Calumet County Board of Supervisors. In 1948, Fox became the chairman of the Wisconsin State Democratic Party. He died of a heart attack at his home in Chilton.

References

1904 births
1957 deaths
People from Chilton, Wisconsin
University of Notre Dame alumni
Marquette University Law School alumni
University of Wisconsin Law School alumni
Military personnel from Wisconsin
Wisconsin lawyers
Mayors of places in Wisconsin
County supervisors in Wisconsin
Democratic Party of Wisconsin chairs
20th-century American politicians
20th-century American lawyers
Democratic Party members of the Wisconsin State Assembly